The 1962–63 2. Oberliga  was the fourteenth 2. Oberliga season, the second tier of the football league system in West Germany. The league operated in three regional divisions, South, Southwest and West. In Northern Germany and West Berlin the 2. Oberliga did not existed, local Amateurligas taking their place instead as the second tier of the league system.

It was the last season of the 2. Oberliga as, following the 1962–63 season, the Bundesliga was introduced which the best Oberliga teams qualified for while the best 2. Oberliga teams went to the new Regionalligas, the new second tier of the league system. Those teams not qualified for the Regionalligas dropped to the third tier, the Amateurligas. The new Regionalligas covered the same regions as the previous 2. Oberligas, the Regionalliga Süd taking over from the 2. Oberliga Süd, the Regionalliga Südwest from the 2. Oberliga Südwest and the Regionalliga West from the 2. Oberliga West. In the two regions without 2. Oberligas Regionalligas were also formed, the Regionalliga Nord and Regionalliga Berlin.

2. Oberliga West
The 1962–63 season saw four new clubs in the league, Arminia Bielefeld and FV Duisburg 08, both promoted from the Amateurliga while Duisburger SV and SV Sodingen had been relegated from the Oberliga West.

2. Oberliga Südwest
The 1962–63 season saw four new clubs in the league, Phönix Bellheim and VfB Wissen, both promoted from the Amateurliga while Phönix Ludwigshafen and Eintracht Trier had been relegated from the Oberliga Südwest.

2. Oberliga Süd
The 1962–63 season saw five new clubs in the league, ESV Ingolstadt, SV Darmstadt 98 and VfR Heilbronn, all three promoted from the Amateurliga while FSV Frankfurt and SV Waldhof Mannheim had been relegated from the Oberliga Süd.

Other tier two leagues
The leagues and league champions of the regions without a 2. Oberliga at the second tier of the league system in 1962–63:
 Amateurliga Berlin — Blau-Weiß 90 Berlin
 Amateurliga Bremen — AGSV Bremen
 Amateurliga Hamburg — HSV Barmbek-Uhlenhorst
 Amateuroberliga Niedersachsen West — VfL Oldenburg
 Amateuroberliga Niedersachsen Ost — SC Leu Braunschweig
 Amateurliga Schleswig-Holstein — Heider SV

References

Sources

External links
 The Oberligas on Fussballdaten.de 

1962-63
2
Ger